Sibi Sathyaraj (also credited as Sibiraj) is an Indian actor working in the Tamil film industry. He is the son of actor Sathyaraj.

Early life and education
Sibi did his schooling in Sherwood Hall Senior Secondary School and Don Bosco Matriculation Higher Secondary School. and Loyola College, Chennai where he completed a degree in commerce.

Film career 

In early 2003, Sibi was set to make his acting debut through Swami, the Tamil remake of the Malayalam film Nandanam (2003), directed by Renjith. However, despite beginning pre-production work, the film was later dropped.

Sibi then started his acting career with the 2003 film Student Number 1, which was a box office failure. In his next four films, Jore (2004), Mannin Maindhan (2005), Vetrivel Sakthivel (2005) and Kovai Brothers (2006), he acted with his father, Sathyaraj, who also produced Sibi's following project, Lee (2007), directed by Prabhu Solomon, where he played the role of a football player. In his early years, several films he was announced to be part of, such as Perumal Swamy, Pattasu and Mamu were shelved midway.

Subsequently, Sibi took a break from acting and his next release Naanayam (2010) released three years after Lee. The film directed by Shakti Soundar Rajan saw Sibi playing his first negative role. Although his performance was well received, the film did not fare well. Following Naanayam he went on another sabbatical, during which he pursued an acting workshop at the New York Film Academy (NYFA) in Los Angeles for three months, before returning in 2014 with Naaigal Jaakirathai, again directed by Shakti Soundar Rajan. The film, which Sibi reportedly accepted after having listening to more than 200 scripts, featured him alongside a Belgian Shepherd dog as the protagonist. His next titles were Pokkiri Raja (2016), Jackson Durai (2016), Kattappava Kanom (2017) and Sathya (2017).

In 2020, Sibiraj playing a cop in the action crime thriller Walter, directed by U. Anbarasan. Then, Kabadadaari (2021) a neo-noir thriller directed by Pradeep Krishnamoorthy, remake of the Kannada film Kavaludaari.

Personal life
On 14 September 2008, Sibi married Revathi, an engineer who works for an IT company in Chennai. The two had been in a relationship for thirteen years before getting married.

Filmography

References

External links
 
 

Living people
Tamil male actors
Don Bosco schools alumni
Loyola College, Chennai alumni
Male actors in Tamil cinema
Male actors from Chennai
1982 births